Žumberk is a market town in Chrudim District in the Pardubice Region of the Czech Republic. It has about 300 inhabitants.

Administrative parts
Hamlets of Částkov and Prostějov are administrative parts of Žumberk.

Sights
Žumberk is known for the ruins of Žumberk Castle, which was built during the 13th century.

Notable people
Bohumil Laušman (1903–1963), politician

Gallery

References

External links

 

Populated places in Chrudim District
Market towns in the Czech Republic